Mangelia labratula is an extinct species of sea snail, a marine gastropod mollusk in the family Mangeliidae.

Description
The length of the shell attains 4 mm..

Distribution
This extinct marine species was found in Eocene strata of the Paris Basin, France.

References

 Cossmann (M.), 1889 Catalogue illustré des coquilles fossiles de l'Éocène des environs de Paris (4ème fascicule). Annales de la Société royale Malacologique de Belgique, t. 24, p. 3-385 
 Cossmann (M.) & Pissarro (G.), 1913 Iconographie complète des coquilles fossiles de l'Éocène des environs de Paris, t. 2, p. pl. 46-65
 Le Renard (J.) & Pacaud (J.-M.), 1995 Révision des Mollusques paléogènes du Bassin de Paris. 2 - Liste des références primaires des espèces. Cossmanniana, t. 3, vol. 3, p. 65-132

External links
 Worldwide Mollusc Species Data Base: Mangelia labratula

labratula
Gastropods described in 1889